The NHK Trophy was held in Chiba on December 9-12. Medals were awarded in the disciplines of men's singles, ladies' singles, pair skating, and ice dancing.

Results

Men

Ladies

Pairs

Ice dancing

External links
 1993 NHK Trophy

Nhk Trophy, 1993
NHK Trophy